Harmonia doris-nilesiae is a species of flowering plant in the family Asteraceae known by the common names serpentine tarweed and Niles' madia.

This plant was first described to science in 1985, when it was named Madia doris-nilesiae after the California botanist and teacher Doris Niles. It and several others were moved to the new genus Harmonia in 1999.

Description
Harmonia doris-nilesiae is an annual herb growing up to about 26 centimeters tall, its upper branches bristly and glandular. The bristly, toothed leaves are up to 4 centimeters long.

The inflorescence bears several flower heads on long, thin peduncles. Each head has yellow disc florets tipped with yellow anthers and 4 to 8 bright yellow ray florets each a few millimeters long. The fruit is a black achene with a small pappus.

Distribution
Harmonia doris-nilesiae is endemic to the southern Klamath Mountains of far northern California, where it grows in serpentine soils.

References

External links
Jepson Manual Treatment: Harmonia doris-nilesiae
USDA Plants Profile: Harmonia doris-nilesiae
Harmonia doris-nilesiae — U.C. Photo gallery

Madieae
Endemic flora of California
Flora of the Klamath Mountains
Plants described in 1985
Natural history of Siskiyou County, California
Flora without expected TNC conservation status